Thomas Alfred Stubbs (13 March 1872 – date of death unknown) was an English cricketer active in first-class cricket from 1893–1894, making four appearances as a batsman.

Having played club cricket in Liverpool for Sefton and Sefton Park in the early 1890s, Stubbs made his debut in first-class cricket when he was selected to play for the Liverpool and District cricket team in 1893 against Yorkshire at Aigburth. He made a further appearance in 1893 against the touring Australians, before playing twice more against Yorkshire and Cambridge University in 1894. He scored a total of 168 runs in his four matches, averaging 24.00, with a high score of 43, which he made against Cambridge University.

References

External links
Thomas Stubbs at ESPNcricinfo
Thomas Stubbs at CricketArchive

1872 births
People from West Derby
English cricketers
Liverpool and District cricketers
Year of death missing